NTR plc is an Irish renewable energy company founded in 1978. Today, NTR is an investor in wind energy, focused on Ireland, France, Sweden and the UK.

NTR previously held stakes in infrastructure interests including Celtic Anglian Water, Greenstar Recycling, and in infrastructural providers of roads through National Toll Roads. It spun these off into a separate company, Atlas Investments, and focused on wind energy in Ireland and the UK.

In 2008, NTR purchased a controlling stake in Wind Capital Group of St. Louis, Missouri, U.S. The company exited the U.S. market in 2015 to "focus on Europe".

NTR is an Irish public limited company. Its shares are not listed on any stock exchange but are traded on the grey market via the company's stockbrokers, Davy Stockbrokers, Goodbody, Merrion Capital Group and Investec.

References

External links
 NTR company website
 Wind Capital Group company website
 Celtic Anglian Water company website

Energy companies of the Republic of Ireland
Renewable energy in the Republic of Ireland
Energy companies established in 1976
Renewable resource companies established in 1976
1976 establishments in Ireland
Renewable energy companies of Ireland